The fourth season of Tawag ng Tanghalan, dubbed as Tawag ng Tanghalan: Ika-Apat na Taon, was an amateur singing competition aired as a segment on the noontime program It's Showtime on ABS-CBN. The segment premiered from January 4, 2020, to February 6, 2021, after Celebrity Champions and All-Star Grand Resbak versions.

Because of the pandemic, and the temporary shutdown of ABS-CBN, the season was halted on March 16, 2020, and after 3 months since the lockdown and legislative franchise, it was resumed on June 13, 2020, via the new cable-and-satellite, Kapamilya Channel and a simulcast in Jeepney TV and A2Z. This season was be halted again from twice due to COVID-19 pandemic: on July 15, 2020, the season was halted due to the 14-day quarantine when a staff person working at the studio tested positive for the coronavirus and returned on August 1, 2020, and on August 5, 2020, the season was halted again due to the 2-week Modified Enhanced Community Quarantine (MECQ) and finally proceeding again on August 15, 2020.

Hosts and judges
Rey Valera and Gary Valenciano returned as the head judges for the fourth season, with Louie Ocampo, Jaya, Ogie Alcasid, Yeng Constantino and Dulce serving as fill-in for both Valera and Valenciano, whereas Zsa Zsa Padilla, Karylle, Karla Estrada, K Brosas, Nyoy Volante, Mitoy Yonting, Erik Santos, Kyla, Jed Madela, Randy Santiago, and Jolina Magdangal would return as judges for the fourth season. Pilita Corrales was added to the panel of judges this season.

Angeline Quinto served as a guest judge for the January 19–23, 2021 episodes.

Vhong Navarro, Amy Perez-Castillo, and Vice Ganda also returned as hosts and Kim Chiu was added as the newest host after being a guest host in Quarter 1, with Ryan Bang, Jhong Hilario, Teddy Corpuz, and Jugs Jugueta serving as co-hosts and gong masters.

Anne Curtis and Mariel Rodriguez-Padilla are on leave due to their pregnancy.

Catriona Gray, Maja Salvador, Yassi Pressman, Bela Padilla, Billy Crawford, Arci Muñoz and Ana Ramsey served as guest hosts in the absence of the main hosts.

Changes

Semifinal Qualifiers 
In this season, the qualifying round for the defending champion for the semifinals will be on their fourth streak instead of five.

Global Tawag ng Tanghalan 
The Global Semifinals was planned to return this season. This round opens the competition to contenders around the world vying for two spots in the Grand Finals. However, due to travel restrictions brought by the COVID-19, this round did not pushed through.

Power of Four 
The four regular judges have also been given the option to signal the gong master if the contender has gone off-tune. They must all press their buzzers to instantly eliminate the contender. The Head Judges maintains its power to gong a contender without the other judges' approval.

New Normal Format 

With the restrictions brought by the COVID-19, a new format, dubbed as the Tawag ng Tanghalan: New Normal, was introduced.

Tawag ng Tanghalan sa Tahanan 
As a result of the enhanced community quarantine in Luzon, the hosts had to work from their homes during the lockdown period. However, once Metro Manila's community quarantine was downgraded, the show went back to the studio. The winning daily contender receives ₱15,000 and advanced to Weekly Finals, while the other contender receives a consolation prize of ₱5,000 and the winner of daily Weekly Finals receives ₱25,000 and take back as a daily contender in the studio.

Color Key:

Contender's Information:

Results Details

Tawag ng Tanghalan: New Normal

Quarter I 
Color Key:

Contender's Information:

Results Details:

Italicized names denotes a contender is a resbaker

 *due to COVID-19 pandemic, the defending champion will proceed after the throwing of cease and desist order due to ABS-CBN shutdown. Also, as a result of the aforementioned pandemic, the season was put on hold until June 13, 2020.

Quarter-end Semifinals 
The semifinals takes place at the end of the each quarter to determine the three grand finalists moving on to the grand finals. The three grand finalists will receive a golden medal and an additional 100,000 cash. If the semifinalists makes a highest combined scores, a home viewer is chosen to instant ₱5,000. The Semifinals week took place on December 28, 2020, to January 2, 2021 (Quarter I), and on January 4 to 9, 2021 (Month-long Quarter Finals). The score will be purely based on the judges unlike the previous seasons. A semi-finalist may be "gonged" during this stage and be eliminated from the competition.

Summary of Semifinalists 
Contender's Information

Results Details

Quarter I Details 

The first quarter of the contest covered the months from January to March. The week-long showdown originally  took place on March 23 to 28, 2020 but postponed to December 28, 2020, to January 2, 2021, after postponed as a result of the 2019–20 coronavirus pandemic and the ABS-CBN shutdown.

Results Details

Nikole Kyle Bernido (Mindanao), Rica Mae Maer (Luzon) and Emmar Cabilogan (Visayas) were declared as the 1st, 2nd and 3rd grand finalists.

New Normal Details 
The Semifinals week originally took place on December 21–26, 2020 due to the 1-week Christmas break, later originally reschedule on December 28, 2020, to January 2, 2021, but was moved due to Quarter 1 Semifinals, and later reschedule again on January 4–9, 2021. A semi-finalist may be "gonged" during this stage and be eliminated from the competition.

Results Details

Ayegee Paredes (Mindanao), JM Yosures (Metro Manila) and Mara Tumale (Luzon) were declared as the 4th, 5th and 6th grand finalists.

Resbakbakan 
Due to the popularity of the Quarter Finals and Semifinals Rounds, the show added another phase, dubbed as Resbakbakan. Losing quarter-finalists (Week 1), weekly finalists and defending champion selected by the hurados (Week 2), and semifinalists (Week 3) who are not gonged may still advance to the week-long Grand Finals through the Resbakbakan Week as wildcards.

The Resbakbakan started immediately after the final day of New Normal Semifinals Round, aired from January 11 to 16, 2021 (Week 1), from January 18 to 23, 2021 (Week 2), and from January 25 to 30, 2021 (Week 3).

It uses a similar format as the Final Resbak in third season, where it follows a last man standing format.

It follows the mechanics below:

 On its first day, the resbaker on the Seat of Power was determined through draw lots.
 The resbaker who is in the Seat of Power picks two resbakers. The three resbakers will be pitted against each other for a chance to claim the Seat of Power. The winner is selected by the majority of the judges. The resbaker with the highest score claims the Seat of Power while the resbaker with the lowest score is eliminated in the competition.
 The resbaker who is in the Seat of Power has the choice to keep his/her seat and continue his/her battle, or dethrone himself/herself to rest. If he/she chooses to keep his/her seat, he/she will chose one resbaker. Else, the resbaker will choose two resbakers for a sing-off battle with the top 2 resbaker in the previous day. The resbaker with the highest score claims the Seat of Power.
If the resbaker keeps the seat of power for three consecutive days, he/she receives an additional 15,000.
 The remaining contender in the Seat of Power at the end of the round will move forward to the week long Grand-Finals dubbed as "Ang Huling Tapatan" while the other contenders are eliminated.

Marlyn Salas (Luzon), Mark Anthony Castro (Luzon), and Arlene Cagas (Metro Manila) chose not to participate in this round due to their other priorities.

Resbakbakan Week 1 (Quarter Finalists)

Summary of Quarter Finalist Resbakers 

Color Key:

Results Details:

Color Key:

Resbakbakan 1 Details 
Color Key:

Donna Gift Ricafrente (Metro Manila) was declared as the 7th grand finalist.

=== Resbakbakan Week 2 (Hurados''' Pick) ===
The concept of Hurados Pick is similar to the Instant Resbak of third season where each Hurado can pick a contender who failed to qualify in the previous rounds.

 Summary of Hurados' Pick Resbakers Color Key:Results Details:Color Key: Resbakbakan 2 Details Color Key:</div>
{| class="wikitable" style="width:100%;text-align:center;font-size:90%;"
! colspan="14" |Sorted by Quarter
|-
! colspan="3" rowspan="2" |Contender
! rowspan="2" width="9%" |Daily RoundsFace-off Rounds
! rowspan="2" width="9%" |Tawag ng Tanghalan: New Normal
! rowspan="2" width="9%" |Quarter Finals
! rowspan="2" width="9%" |Quarter-end Semifinals
! colspan="3" |Resbak Rounds(Wildcard Rounds)
! colspan="3" |Ang Huling Tapatan(Week-long Grand Finals)
! rowspan="2" width="6%" |Prize Won
|-
! width="9%" |Resbakbakan (Quarter Finalists)
! width="9%" |[[#Resbakbakan Week 2 (Hurados' Pick)|Hurados''' Pick Resbak (Judges Choice)]]
! width="9%" |Final Resbak (Semi Finalists)
! width="9%" |Daily Rounds
! width="9%" |Top 6
! width="9%" |Final 3
|-
! colspan="14" style="background-color:#202020;" |
|-
!I
! style="background-color:#8deb87;" width="1%" |
! Emmar Cabilogan
| style="background-color:#FDFD96;" |Advanced
| style="background-color:lightgray;" |
| style="background-color:#BFFFC0;" |Advanced
| colspan="4" style="background-color:#ffff00;" |Safe
| style="background-color:#FFFDD0;" |Advanced
| style="background-color:#B2EC5D;" |Fourth Placer
| rowspan="2" style="background-color:salmon;" |Eliminated (Huling Tapatan Live Rounds)|220,000
|-
!I
! style="background-color:#0038A8;" width="1%" |
!Nikole Kyle Bernido
| style="background-color:#FDFD96;" |Advanced
| style="background-color:lightgray;" |
| style="background-color:#BFFFC0;" |Advanced
| colspan="4" style="background-color:#ffff00;" |Safe
| style="background-color:#FFFDD0;" |Advanced
| style="background-color:#B2EC5D;" |Sixth Placer
|245,000
|-
! width="1%" |I
! style="background-color:#FCD116;" width="1%" |
!Rica Mae Maer
| style="background-color:#FDFD96;" |Advanced
| style="background-color:lightgray;" |
| style="background-color:#BFFFC0;" |Advanced
| colspan="4" style="background-color:#ffff00;" |Safe
|style="background-color:#FBCEB1;"| Ninth Placer
| colspan="2" style="background-color:salmon;" | Eliminated (Huling Tapatan Daily Rounds)|210,000
|-
! width="1%" |I
! style="background-color:#FCD116;" width="1%" |
!Jessa Mae Gallemaso
| style="background-color:#FDFD96;" |Advanced
| style="background-color:lightgray;" |
| style="background-color:#FFFDD0;" |Advanced
| style="background-color:turquoise;" |Advanced
| colspan="2" style="background-color:lightgray;" |
| style="background-color:pink;" |Eliminated 
| colspan="3" style="background-color:salmon;"|Eliminated  (Final Resbak Week)
|170,000
|-
! width="1%" |I
! style="background-color:#8deb87;" width="1%" |
!Cherry Lyn Pausal
| style="background-color:#FDFD96;" |Advanced
| style="background-color:lightgray;" |
| style="background:#FFFDD0;" |Advanced
| style="background-color:turquoise;" |Advanced
| colspan="2" style="background-color:lightgray;" |
| style="background-color:pink;" |Eliminated 
| colspan="3" style="background-color:salmon;"|Eliminated  (Final Resbak Week)
|145,000
|-
! width="1%" |I
! style="background-color:#CE1126;" width="1%" |
!Arlene Cagas
| style="background-color:#FDFD96;" |Advanced
| style="background-color:lightgray;" |
| style="background-color:#FFFDD0;" |Advanced
| style="background-color:turquoise;" |Advanced
| colspan="2" style="background-color:lightgray;" |
| style="background-color:#a0a0a0;" | Withdrew
| colspan="3" style="background-color:salmon;" |Withdrew  (Final Resbak Week) 
|120,000
|-
!I
! style="background-color:#CE1126;" width="1%" |
!Daphny Mandin
| style="background-color:#B0E0E6;" |Saved by Zsa Zsa Padilla| colspan="4" style="background-color:lightgray;" |
| style="background:pink;" | Eliminated
| colspan="4" style="background-color: salmon;" | Eliminated  (Hurados' Pick Resbak) 
|₱85,000
|-
!I
!style="background-color:#0038A8;" width=1%" |
!Luzviminda Piedad
|style="background-color:#FDFD96;"|Advanced
| colspan="2"style="background-color:lightgray;"|
|style="background:red;"| Gonged
| colspan="6" style="background-color: salmon;" |Gonged (Semifinals Week)
|145,000
|-
! colspan="14" style="background-color:#202020;" |
|-
!New Normal
! style="background-color:#CE1126;" width="1%" |
!JM Yosures
| style="background-color:lightgray;" |
| style="background-color:#FFFDD0;" |Advanced
| style="background-color:#FDFD96;" |Advanced
| style="background-color:#BFFFC0;" |Advanced
| colspan="3" style="background-color:#ffff00;" |Safe
| style="background-color:#FFFDD0;"|Advanced
| style="background-color:#FFFDD0;"|Advanced
| style="background-color:gold;"|Grand Champion
|₱1,190,000
|-
!New Normal
! style="background-color:#FCD116;" width="1%" |
!Rachell Laylo
| style="background-color:lightgray;" |
| style="background-color:#FFFDD0;" |Advanced
| style="background-color:#FDFD96;" |Advanced
| style="background-color:turquoise;" |Advanced
| colspan="2" style="background-color:lightgray;" |
| style="background-color:#BFFFC0;" |Advanced
| style="background-color:#FFFDD0;" |Advanced
| style="background-color:#FFFDD0;" |Advanced
| style="background-color:silver;" |Second Placer
|₱390,000
|-
!New Normal
! style="background-color:#0038A8;" width="1%"" |
!Ayegee Paredes
| style="background-color:lightgray;" |
| style="background-color:#FFFDD0;" |Advanced
| style="background-color:#FDFD96;" |Advanced
| style="background-color:#BFFFC0;" |Advanced
| colspan="3" style="background-color:#ffff00;" |Safe
| style="background-color:#FFFDD0;" |Advanced
| style="background-color:#FFFDD0;" |Advanced
| style="background-color:tan;" |Third Placer
|₱290,000
|-
!New Normal
! style="background-color:#FCD116;" width="1%" |
!Makki Lucino
| style="background-color:lightgray;" |
| style="background-color:#B0E0E6;" |Saved by Erik Santos| colspan="3" style="background-color:lightgray;" |
| style="background-color:#BFFFC0;" |Advanced
| style="background-color:#ffff00;" |Safe
| style="background-color:#FFFDD0;" |Advanced
| style="background-color:#B2EC5D;" |Fifth Placer
| style="background-color:salmon;" |Eliminated (Huling Tapatan Live Rounds)|₱120,000
|-
!New Normal
!style="background-color:#FCD116;" width="1%" |
!Mara Tumale
|style="background-color:lightgray;"|
| style="background-color:#FFFDD0;"|Advanced
| style="background-color:#FDFD96;"|Advanced
| style="background-color:#BFFFC0;"|Advanced
| colspan="3"  style="background-color:#ffff00;" |Safe
| style="background-color:#FBCEB1;" | Seventh Placer
| colspan="2" style="background-color:salmon;" | Eliminated (Huling Tapatan Daily Rounds)|₱190,000
|-
!New Normal
! style="background-color:#CE1126;" width="1%" |
!Donna Gift Ricafrente
| style="background-color:lightgray;" |
| style="background-color:#FFFDD0;" |Advanced
| style="background-color:azure;" |Advanced
| style="background-color:lightgray;" |
| style="background-color:#BFFFC0;" |Advanced
| colspan="2" style="background-color:#ffff00;" |Safe
| style="background-color:#FBCEB1;" | Eighth Placer
| colspan="2" style="background-color:salmon;" | Eliminated (Huling Tapatan Daily Rounds)|₱150,000
|-
!New Normal
!style="background-color:#FCD116;" width="1%" |
!Almira Lat
|style="background-color:lightgray;"|
| style="background-color:#FFFDD0;"|Advanced
| style="background-color:#FDFD96;"|Advanced
|style="background-color:turquoise;" |Advanced
| colspan="2" style="background-color:lightgray;"|
| style="background-color:pink;"|Eliminated
| colspan="3" style="background-color:salmon;" |Eliminated  (Final Resbak Week) 
|₱90,000
|-
!New Normal
!style="background-color:#FCD116;" width="1%" |
!Wincel Mae Portugal-Maglanque
|style="background-color:lightgray;"|
| style="background-color:#FFFDD0;"|Advanced
| style="background-color:#FDFD96;"|Advanced
|style="background-color:turquoise;" |Advanced
| colspan="2" style="background-color:lightgray;"|
| style="background-color:pink;"|Eliminated
| colspan="3" style="background-color:salmon;" |Eliminated  (Final Resbak Week) 
|₱90,000
|-
!New Normal
!style="background-color:#CE1126;" width="1%" |
!Mich Primavera
|style="background-color:lightgray;"|
| style="background-color:#FFFDD0;"|Advanced
| style="background-color:#FDFD96;"|Advanced
|style="background-color:turquoise;" |Advanced
| colspan="2" style="background-color:lightgray;"|
| style="background-color:pink;"|Eliminated
| colspan="3" style="background-color:salmon;" |Eliminated  (Final Resbak Week) 
|₱90,000
|-
!New Normal
!style="background-color:#FCD116;" width="1%" |
!Eivan Darrel Enriquez
|style="background-color:lightgray;"|
| style="background-color:#FFFDD0;"|Advanced
| style="background-color:#FDFD96;"|Advanced
|style="background-color:turquoise;" |Advanced
| colspan="2" style="background-color:lightgray;"|
| style="background-color:pink;"|Eliminated
| colspan="3" style="background-color:salmon;" |Eliminated  (Final Resbak Week) 
|₱90,000
|-
!New Normal
!style="background-color:#FCD116;" width="1%" |
!Venus Pelobello
|style="background-color:lightgray;"|
| style="background-color:#FFFDD0;"|Advanced
| style="background-color:#FDFD96;"|Advanced
|style="background-color:turquoise;" |Advanced
| colspan="2" style="background-color:lightgray;"|
| style="background-color:pink;"|Eliminated
| colspan="3" style="background-color:salmon;" |Eliminated  (Final Resbak Week) 
|₱90,000
|-
!New Normal
!style="background-color:#0038A8;" width=1%" |
!Chaddy Ruaza
|style="background-color:lightgray;"|
|style="background-color:#B0E0E6;" |Saved by Mitoy Yonting| colspan="3" style="background-color:lightgray;"|
| style="background-color:pink;"|Eliminated
| colspan="4" style="background-color:salmon;" |Eliminated  (Hurados' Pick Resbak) 
|₱20,000
|-
!New Normal
!style="background-color:#FCD116;" width="1%" |
!Aljon Gutierrez
|style="background-color:lightgray;"|
|style="background-color:#B0E0E6;" |Saved by Nyoy Volante| colspan="3" style="background-color:lightgray;"|
| style="background-color:pink;"|Eliminated
| colspan="4" style="background-color:salmon;" |Eliminated  (Hurados' Pick Resbak) 
|₱20,000
|-
!New Normal
!style="background-color:#CE1126;" width="1%" |
!Brian Constantinopla
|style="background-color:lightgray;"|
|style="background-color:#B0E0E6;" |Saved by Karylle| colspan="3" style="background-color:lightgray;"|
| style="background-color:pink;"|Eliminated
| colspan="4" style="background-color:salmon;" |Eliminated  (Hurados' Pick Resbak) 
|₱20,000
|-
!New Normal
!style="background-color:#FCD116;" width="1%" |
!Glenford Gamilde
|style="background-color:lightgray;"|
|style="background-color:#B0E0E6;" |Saved by Jaya| colspan="3" style="background-color:lightgray;"|
| style="background-color:pink;"|Eliminated
| colspan="4" style="background-color:salmon;" |Eliminated  (Hurados' Pick Resbak) 
|₱20,000
|-
!New Normal
!style="background-color:#FCD116;" width="1%" |
!Neil Collado
|style="background-color:lightgray;"|
|style="background-color:#B0E0E6;" |Saved by Kyla| colspan="3" style="background-color:lightgray;"|
| style="background-color:pink;"|Eliminated
| colspan="4" style="background-color:salmon;" |Eliminated  (Hurados' Pick Resbak) 
|₱20,000
|-
!New Normal
!style="background-color:#8deb87;" width="1%" | 
!Verr Iguban
|style="background-color:lightgray;"|
|style="background-color:#B0E0E6;" |Saved by Ogie Alcasid| colspan="3" style="background-color:lightgray;"|
| style="background-color:pink;"|Eliminated
| colspan="4" style="background-color:salmon;" |Eliminated  (Hurados' Pick Resbak) 
|₱20,000
|-
!New Normal
!style="background-color:#FCD116;" width="1%" |
!Jerome Granada
|style="background-color:lightgray;"|
|style="background-color:#B0E0E6;" |Saved by Jed Madela| colspan="3" style="background-color:lightgray;"|
| style="background-color:pink;"|Eliminated
| colspan="4" style="background-color:salmon;" |Eliminated  (Hurados' Pick Resbak) 
|₱20,000
|-
!New Normal
!style="background-color:#FCD116;" width="1%" |
!Evelyn Grace Martinez
|style="background-color:lightgray;"|
| style="background-color:#FFFDD0;"|Advanced
|style="background-color:azure;" |Advanced
|style="background-color:lightgray;"|
| style="background-color:pink;"|Eliminated
| colspan="5" style="background-color:salmon;" |Eliminated  (Resbakbakan Week 1) 
|₱50,000
|-
!New Normal
!style="background-color:#CE1126;" width="1%" |
!Opalhene Rose Paghubasan
|style="background-color:lightgray;"|
| style="background-color:#FFFDD0;"|Advanced
|style="background-color:azure;" |Advanced
|style="background-color:lightgray;"|
| style="background-color:pink;"|Eliminated
| colspan="5" style="background-color:salmon;" |Eliminated  (Resbakbakan Week 1) 
|₱50,000
|-
!New Normal
!style="background-color:#FCD116;" width="1%" |
!Rommel Arellano
|style="background-color:lightgray;"|
| style="background-color:#FFFDD0;"|Advanced
|style="background-color:azure;" |Advanced
|style="background-color:lightgray;"|
| style="background-color:pink;"|Eliminated
| colspan="5" style="background-color:salmon;" |Eliminated  (Resbakbakan Week 1) 
|₱50,000
|-
!New Normal
!style="background-color:#FCD116;" width="1%" |
!Shan Dela Vega
|style="background-color:lightgray;"|
| style="background-color:#FFFDD0;"|Advanced
|style="background-color:azure;" |Advanced
|style="background-color:lightgray;"|
| style="background-color:pink;"|Eliminated
| colspan="5" style="background-color:salmon;" |Eliminated  (Resbakbakan Week 1) 
|₱50,000
|-
!New Normal
!style="background-color:#FCD116;" width="1%" |
!Luis Gragera
|style="background-color:lightgray;"|
| style="background-color:#FFFDD0;"|Advanced
|style="background-color:azure;" |Advanced
|style="background-color:lightgray;"|
| style="background-color:pink;"|Eliminated
| colspan="5" style="background-color:salmon;" |Eliminated  (Resbakbakan Week 1) 
|₱50,000
|-
!New Normal
!style="background-color:#FCD116;" width="1%" |
!Marigelle Aguda
|style="background-color:lightgray;"|
| style="background-color:#FFFDD0;"|Advanced
|style="background-color:azure;" |Advanced
|style="background-color:lightgray;"|
| style="background-color:pink;"|Eliminated
| colspan="5" style="background-color:salmon;" |Eliminated  (Resbakbakan Week 1) 
|₱50,000
|-
!New Normal
!style="background-color:#FCD116;" width="1%" |
!Erwin Diaz
|style="background-color:lightgray;"|
| style="background-color:#FFFDD0;"|Advanced
|style="background-color:azure;" |Withdrew
|style="background-color:lightgray;"|
| style="background-color:pink;"|Eliminated
| colspan="5" style="background-color:salmon;" |Eliminated  (Resbakbakan Week 1) 
|₱50,000
|-
!New Normal
!style="background-color:#CE1126;" width="1%" |
!Isaac Zamudio
|style="background-color:lightgray;"|
| style="background-color:#FFFDD0;"|Advanced
|style="background-color:azure;" |Advanced
|style="background-color:lightgray;"|
| style="background-color:pink;"|Eliminated
| colspan="5" style="background-color:salmon;" |Eliminated  (Resbakbakan Week 1) 
|₱50,000
|-
!New Normal
!style="background-color:#FCD116;" width="1%" |
!Mark Anthony Castro
|style="background-color:lightgray;"|
| style="background-color:#FFFDD0;"|Advanced
|style="background-color:azure;" |Advanced
|style="background-color:lightgray;"|
| style="background-color:#a0a0a0;"| Withdrew
| colspan="5" style="background-color:salmon;" |Withdrew  (Resbakbakan Week 1) 
|₱50,000
|-
!New Normal
!style="background-color:#FCD116;" width="1%" |
!Marlyn Salas
|style="background-color:lightgray;"|
| style="background-color:#FFFDD0;"|Advanced
|style="background-color:azure;" |Advanced
|style="background-color:lightgray;"|
| style="background-color:#a0a0a0;"| Withdrew
| colspan="5" style="background-color:salmon;" |Withdrew  (Resbakbakan Week 1) 
|₱50,000
|-
|}

{| class="wikitable" style="width:100%;text-align:center;font-size:90%;"
! colspan="14" |Sorted by Region
|-
! colspan="3" rowspan="2" |Contender
! rowspan="2" width="9%" |Daily RoundsFace-off Rounds
! rowspan="2" width="9%" |Tawag ng Tanghalan: New Normal
! rowspan="2" width="9%" |Quarter Finals
! rowspan="2" width="9%" |Quarter-end Semifinals
! colspan="3" |Resbak Rounds(Wildcard Rounds)
! colspan="3" |Ang Huling Tapatan(Week-long Grand Finals)
! rowspan="2" width="6%" |Prize Won
|-
! width="9%" |Resbakbakan (Quarter Finalists)
! width="9%" |[[#Resbakbakan Week 2 (Hurados' Pick)|Hurados Pick Resbak (Judges Choice)]]
! width="9%" |Final Resbak (Semi Finalists)
! width="9%" |Daily Rounds
! width="9%" |Top 6
! width="9%" |Final 3
|-
! colspan="14" style="background-color:#202020;" |
|-
!New Normal
! style="background-color:#CE1126;" width="1%" |
!JM Yosures
| style="background-color:lightgray;" |
| style="background-color:#FFFDD0;" |Advanced
| style="background-color:#FDFD96;" |Advanced
| style="background-color:#BFFFC0;" |Advanced
| colspan="3" style="background-color:#ffff00;" |Safe
| style="background-color:#FFFDD0;"|Advanced
| style="background-color:#FFFDD0;"|Advanced
| style="background-color:gold;"|Grand Champion
|₱1,190,000
|-
!New Normal
! style="background-color:#CE1126;" width="1%" |
!Donna Gift Ricafrente
| style="background-color:lightgray;" |
| style="background-color:#FFFDD0;" |Advanced
| style="background-color:azure;" |Advanced
| style="background-color:lightgray;" |
| style="background-color:#BFFFC0;" |Advanced
| colspan="2" style="background-color:#ffff00;" |Safe
| style="background-color:#FBCEB1;" | Eighth Placer
| colspan="2" style="background-color:salmon;" | Eliminated (Huling Tapatan Daily Rounds)
|₱150,000
|-
!New Normal
! style="background-color:#CE1126;" width="1%" |
!Mich Primavera
| style="background-color:lightgray;" |
| style="background-color:#FFFDD0;" |Advanced
| style="background-color:#FDFD96;" |Advanced
| style="background-color:turquoise;" |Advanced
| colspan="2" style="background-color:lightgray;" |
| style="background-color:pink;" |Eliminated
| colspan="3" style="background-color:salmon;" |Eliminated  (Final Resbak Week)
|₱90,000
|-
! width="1%" |I
! style="background-color:#CE1126;" width="1%" |
!Arlene Cagas
| style="background-color:#FDFD96;" |Advanced
| style="background-color:lightgray;" |
| style="background-color:#FFFDD0;" |Advanced
| style="background-color:turquoise;" |Advanced
| colspan="2" style="background-color:lightgray;" |
| style="background-color:#a0a0a0;" | Withdrew
| colspan="3" style="background-color:salmon;" |Withdrew  (Final Resbak Week)
|120,000
|-
!New Normal
! style="background-color:#CE1126;" width="1%" |
!Brian Constantinopla
| style="background-color:lightgray;" |
| style="background-color:#B0E0E6;" |Saved by Karylle
| colspan="3" style="background-color:lightgray;" |
| style="background-color:pink;" |Eliminated
| colspan="4" style="background-color:salmon;" |Eliminated  (Hurados' Pick Resbak)
|₱20,000
|-
!I
! style="background-color:#CE1126;" width="1%" |
!Daphny Mandin
| style="background-color:#B0E0E6;" |Saved by Zsa Zsa Padilla
| colspan="4" style="background-color:lightgray;" |
| style="background:pink;" | Eliminated
| colspan="4" style="background-color: salmon;" | Eliminated  (Hurados' Pick Resbak) 
|₱85,000
|-
!New Normal
! style="background-color:#CE1126;" width="1%" |
!Opalhene Rose Paghubasan
| style="background-color:lightgray;" |
| style="background-color:#FFFDD0;" |Advanced
| style="background-color:azure;" |Advanced
| style="background-color:lightgray;" |
| style="background-color:pink;" |Eliminated
| colspan="5" style="background-color:salmon;" |Eliminated  (Resbakbakan Week 1)
|₱50,000
|-
!New Normal
! style="background-color:#CE1126;" width="1%" |
!Isaac Zamudio
| style="background-color:lightgray;" |
| style="background-color:#FFFDD0;" |Advanced
| style="background-color:azure;" |Advanced
| style="background-color:lightgray;" |
| style="background-color:pink;" |Eliminated
| colspan="5" style="background-color:salmon;" |Eliminated  (Resbakbakan Week 1)
|₱50,000
|-
! colspan="14" style="background-color:#202020;" |
|-
!New Normal
! style="background-color:#FCD116;" width="1%" |
!Rachell Laylo
| style="background-color:lightgray;" |
| style="background-color:#FFFDD0;" |Advanced
| style="background-color:#FDFD96;" |Advanced
| style="background-color:turquoise;" |Advanced
| colspan="2" style="background-color:lightgray;" |
| style="background-color:#BFFFC0;" |Advanced
| style="background-color:#FFFDD0;"|Advanced
| style="background-color:#FFFDD0;"|Advanced
| style="background-color:silver;"|Second Placer
|₱390,000
|-
!New Normal
! style="background-color:#FCD116;" width="1%" |
!Makki Lucino
| style="background-color:lightgray;" |
| style="background-color:#B0E0E6;" |Saved by Erik Santos
| colspan="3" style="background-color:lightgray;" |
| style="background-color:#BFFFC0;" |Advanced
| style="background-color:#ffff00;" |Safe
| style="background-color:#FFFDD0;" |Advanced
| style="background-color:#B2EC5D;" |Fifth Placer
| style="background-color:salmon;" |Eliminated (Huling Tapatan Live Rounds)
|₱120,000
|-
!New Normal
! style="background-color:#FCD116;" width="1%" |
!Mara Tumale
| style="background-color:lightgray;" |
| style="background-color:#FFFDD0;" |Advanced
| style="background-color:#FDFD96;" |Advanced
| style="background-color:#BFFFC0;" |Advanced
| colspan="3" style="background-color:#ffff00;" |Safe
| style="background-color:#FBCEB1;" | Seventh Placer
| colspan="2" style="background-color:salmon;" | Eliminated (Huling Tapatan Daily Rounds)
|₱190,000
|-
! width="1%" |I
! style="background-color:#FCD116;" width="1%" |
!Rica Mae Maer
| style="background-color:#FDFD96;" |Advanced
| style="background-color:lightgray;" |
| style="background-color:#BFFFC0;" |Advanced
| colspan="4" style="background-color:#ffff00;" |Safe
|style="background-color:#FBCEB1;"| Ninth Placer
| colspan="2" style="background-color:salmon;" | Eliminated (Huling Tapatan Daily Rounds)
|210,000
|-
! width="1%" |I
! style="background-color:#FCD116;" width="1%" |
!Jessa Mae Gallemaso
| style="background-color:#FDFD96;" |Advanced
| style="background-color:lightgray;" |
| style="background-color:#FFFDD0;" |Advanced
| style="background-color:turquoise;" |Advanced
| colspan="2" style="background-color:lightgray;" |
| style="background-color:pink;" |Eliminated 
| colspan="3" style="background-color:salmon;"|Eliminated  (Final Resbak Week)
|170,000
|-
!New Normal
! style="background-color:#FCD116;" width="1%" |
!Almira Lat
| style="background-color:lightgray;" |
| style="background-color:#FFFDD0;" |Advanced
| style="background-color:#FDFD96;" |Advanced
| style="background-color:turquoise;" |Advanced
| colspan="2" style="background-color:lightgray;" |
| style="background-color:pink;" |Eliminated
| colspan="3" style="background-color:salmon;" |Eliminated  (Final Resbak Week) 
|₱90,000
|-
!New Normal
! style="background-color:#FCD116;" width="1%" |
!Wincel Mae Portugal-Maglanque
| style="background-color:lightgray;" |
| style="background-color:#FFFDD0;" |Advanced
| style="background-color:#FDFD96;" |Advanced
| style="background-color:turquoise;" |Advanced
| colspan="2" style="background-color:lightgray;" |
| style="background-color:pink;" |Eliminated
| colspan="3" style="background-color:salmon;" |Eliminated  (Final Resbak Week) 
|₱90,000
|-
!New Normal
! style="background-color:#FCD116;" width="1%" |
!Eivan Darrel Enriquez
| style="background-color:lightgray;" |
| style="background-color:#FFFDD0;" |Advanced
| style="background-color:#FDFD96;" |Advanced
| style="background-color:turquoise;" |Advanced
| colspan="2" style="background-color:lightgray;" |
| style="background-color:pink;" |Eliminated
| colspan="3" style="background-color:salmon;" |Eliminated  (Final Resbak Week) 
|₱90,000
|-
!New Normal
! style="background-color:#FCD116;" width="1%" |
!Venus Pelobello
| style="background-color:lightgray;" |
| style="background-color:#FFFDD0;" |Advanced
| style="background-color:#FDFD96;" |Advanced
| style="background-color:turquoise;" |Advanced
| colspan="2" style="background-color:lightgray;" |
| style="background-color:pink;" |Eliminated
| colspan="3" style="background-color:salmon;" |Eliminated  (Final Resbak Week) 
|₱90,000
|-
!New Normal
! style="background-color:#FCD116;" width="1%" |
!Aljon Gutierrez
| style="background-color:lightgray;" |
| style="background-color:#B0E0E6;" |Saved by Nyoy Volante
| colspan="3" style="background-color:lightgray;" |
| style="background-color:pink;" |Eliminated
| colspan="4" style="background-color:salmon;" |Eliminated  (Hurados' Pick Resbak) 
|₱20,000
|-
!New Normal
! style="background-color:#FCD116;" width="1%" |
!Glenford Gamilde
| style="background-color:lightgray;" |
| style="background-color:#B0E0E6;" |Saved by Jaya
| colspan="3" style="background-color:lightgray;" |
| style="background-color:pink;" |Eliminated
| colspan="4" style="background-color:salmon;" |Eliminated  (Hurados' Pick Resbak) 
|₱20,000
|-
!New Normal
! style="background-color:#FCD116;" width="1%" |
!Neil Collado
| style="background-color:lightgray;" |
| style="background-color:#B0E0E6;" |Saved by Kyla
| colspan="3" style="background-color:lightgray;" |
| style="background-color:pink;" |Eliminated
| colspan="4" style="background-color:salmon;" |Eliminated  (Hurados' Pick Resbak) 
|₱20,000
|-
!New Normal
! style="background-color:#FCD116;" width="1%" |
!Jerome Granada
| style="background-color:lightgray;" |
| style="background-color:#B0E0E6;" |Saved by Jed Madela
| colspan="3" style="background-color:lightgray;" |
| style="background-color:pink;" |Eliminated
| colspan="4" style="background-color:salmon;" |Eliminated  (Hurados' Pick Resbak) 
|₱20,000
|-
!New Normal
! style="background-color:#FCD116;" width="1%" |
!Evelyn Grace Martinez
| style="background-color:lightgray;" |
| style="background-color:#FFFDD0;" |Advanced
| style="background-color:azure;" |Advanced
| style="background-color:lightgray;" |
| style="background-color:pink;" |Eliminated
| colspan="5" style="background-color:salmon;" |Eliminated  (Resbakbakan Week 1) 
|₱50,000
|-
!New Normal
! style="background-color:#FCD116;" width="1%" |
!Rommel Arellano
| style="background-color:lightgray;" |
| style="background-color:#FFFDD0;" |Advanced
| style="background-color:azure;" |Advanced
| style="background-color:lightgray;" |
| style="background-color:pink;" |Eliminated
| colspan="5" style="background-color:salmon;" |Eliminated  (Resbakbakan Week 1) 
|₱50,000
|-
!New Normal
! style="background-color:#FCD116;" width="1%" |
!Shan Dela Vega
| style="background-color:lightgray;" |
| style="background-color:#FFFDD0;" |Advanced
| style="background-color:azure;" |Advanced
| style="background-color:lightgray;" |
| style="background-color:pink;" |Eliminated
| colspan="5" style="background-color:salmon;" |Eliminated  (Resbakbakan Week 1) 
|₱50,000
|-
!New Normal
! style="background-color:#FCD116;" width="1%" |
!Luis Gragera
| style="background-color:lightgray;" |
| style="background-color:#FFFDD0;" |Advanced
| style="background-color:azure;" |Advanced
| style="background-color:lightgray;" |
| style="background-color:pink;" |Eliminated
| colspan="5" style="background-color:salmon;" |Eliminated  (Resbakbakan Week 1) 
|₱50,000
|-
!New Normal
! style="background-color:#FCD116;" width="1%" |
!Marigelle Aguda
| style="background-color:lightgray;" |
| style="background-color:#FFFDD0;" |Advanced
| style="background-color:azure;" |Advanced
| style="background-color:lightgray;" |
| style="background-color:pink;" |Eliminated
| colspan="5" style="background-color:salmon;" |Eliminated  (Resbakbakan Week 1) 
|₱50,000
|-
!New Normal
! style="background-color:#FCD116;" width="1%" |
!Erwin Diaz
| style="background-color:lightgray;" |
| style="background-color:#FFFDD0;" |Advanced
| style="background-color:azure;" |Withdrew
| style="background-color:lightgray;" |
| style="background-color:pink;" |Eliminated
| colspan="5" style="background-color:salmon;" |Eliminated  (Resbakbakan Week 1) 
|₱50,000
|-
!New Normal
! style="background-color:#FCD116;" width="1%" |
!Mark Anthony Castro
| style="background-color:lightgray;" |
| style="background-color:#FFFDD0;" |Advanced
| style="background-color:azure;" |Advanced
| style="background-color:lightgray;" |
| style="background-color:#a0a0a0;" | Withdrew
| colspan="5" style="background-color:salmon;" |Withdrew  (Resbakbakan Week 1) 
|₱50,000
|-
!New Normal
! style="background-color:#FCD116;" width="1%" |
!Marlyn Salas
| style="background-color:lightgray;" |
| style="background-color:#FFFDD0;" |Advanced
| style="background-color:azure;" |Advanced
| style="background-color:lightgray;" |
| style="background-color:#a0a0a0;" | Withdrew
| colspan="5" style="background-color:salmon;" |Withdrew  (Resbakbakan Week 1) 
|₱50,000
|-
! colspan="14" style="background-color:#202020;" |
|-
!I
! style="background-color:#8deb87;" width="1%" |
! Emmar Cabilogan
| style="background-color:#FDFD96;" |Advanced
| style="background-color:lightgray;" |
| style="background-color:#BFFFC0;" |Advanced
| colspan="4" style="background-color:#ffff00;" |Safe
| style="background-color:#FFFDD0;"|Advanced
| style="background-color:#B2EC5D;"|Fourth Placer
| style="background-color:salmon;"|Eliminated (Huling Tapatan Live Rounds)
|220,000
|-
! width="1%" |I
! style="background-color:#8deb87;" width="1%" |
!Cherry Lyn Pausal
| style="background-color:#FDFD96;" |Advanced
| style="background-color:lightgray;" |
| style="background:#FFFDD0;" |Advanced
| style="background-color:turquoise;" |Advanced
| colspan="2" style="background-color:lightgray;" |
| style="background-color:pink;" |Eliminated 
| colspan="3" style="background-color:salmon;"|Eliminated  (Final Resbak Week)
|145,000
|-
!New Normal
! style="background-color:#8deb87;" width="1%" |
!Verr Iguban
| style="background-color:lightgray;" |
| style="background-color:#B0E0E6;" |Saved by Ogie Alcasid
| colspan="3" style="background-color:lightgray;" |
| style="background-color:pink;" |Eliminated
| colspan="4" style="background-color:salmon;" |Eliminated  (Hurados' Pick Resbak)
|₱20,000
|-
! colspan="14" style="background-color:#202020;" |
|-
!New Normal
! style="background-color:#0038A8;" width="1%"" |
!Ayegee Paredes
| style="background-color:lightgray;" |
| style="background-color:#FFFDD0;" |Advanced
| style="background-color:#FDFD96;" |Advanced
| style="background-color:#BFFFC0;" |Advanced
| colspan="3" style="background-color:#ffff00;" |Safe
| style="background-color:#FFFDD0;"|Advanced
| style="background-color:#FFFDD0;"|Advanced
| style="background-color:tan;"|Third Placer
|₱290,000
|-
!I
! style="background-color:#0038A8;" width="1%" |
!Nikole Kyle Bernido
| style="background-color:#FDFD96;" |Advanced
| style="background-color:lightgray;" |
| style="background-color:#BFFFC0;" |Advanced
| colspan="4" style="background-color:#ffff00;" |Safe
| style="background-color:#FFFDD0;" |Advanced
| style="background-color:#B2EC5D;" |Sixth Placer
| style="background-color:salmon;" |Eliminated (Huling Tapatan Live Rounds)
|245,000
|-
!New Normal
! style="background-color:#0038A8;" width="1%"" |
!Chaddy Ruaza
| style="background-color:lightgray;" |
| style="background-color:#B0E0E6;" |Saved by Mitoy Yonting
| colspan="3" style="background-color:lightgray;" |
| style="background-color:pink;" |Eliminated
| colspan="4" style="background-color:salmon;" |Eliminated  (Hurados' Pick Resbak)
|₱20,000
|-
!I
! style="background-color:#0038A8;" width="1%"" |
!Luzviminda Piedad
| style="background-color:#FDFD96;" |Advanced
| colspan="2" style="background-color:lightgray;" |
| style="background:red;" | Gonged
| colspan="6" style="background-color: salmon;" |Gonged (Semifinals Week)
|145,000
|-

|}
 Prize won only indicate their recent victor, not their cumulative prize won in the entirety of the season. (Example: If a contender returns as a resbaker, their prize won is reverted to zero)

Notable contestants 

Quarter I
Daphny Mandin joined in third season of Tawag ng Tanghalan under the screen name, Francine Mandin, but she lost.
Junbert Nuevo joined in second season of Tawag ng Tanghalan, but he lost.
Carmen Felipe joined in second season of Tawag ng Tanghalan, but she lost.
Raymundo Lucy joined in third season of Tawag ng Tanghalan under the screen name, Raymond Bugoy Lucy, but he lost.
Grace Alade auditioned on the first season of The Voice Kids and joined Team Lea. She was eliminated in the battles. She also joined in second season of Tawag ng Tanghalan, and won as daily winner but she lost to the new Quarter II semi-finalist John Raymundo.
 Fe Garcia auditioned on the first season of Asia's Got Talent, but did not advance further. She was also a participant on Stars on 45, a former segment of It's Showtime.
 Reagan Ricafort auditioned on the first season of The Voice of the Philippines under the screen name,  Maki Ricafort, and joined Team Sarah. He was eliminated in the Third Live Shows to Morissette Amon. He was a former member of the band, South Border. He also became one of the Songbees in The Singing Bee.
Joshua Madrid joined in second season of Tawag ng Tanghalan, but he lost.
Micoline Acedera joined in Idol Philippines. She was eliminated in the Group Round.
Manny Lucas won as daily winner in second season of Tawag ng Tanghalan, and became a defending champion but he lost.
Cherry Lyn Pausal joined in second season of Tawag ng Tanghalan, but she lost.
Paulette Cambronero joined in first season of Tawag ng Tanghalan, but she lost. She was also a participant of Wil to Win, a former segment of Wowowin.
 Lift John Demonteverde won as daily winner in Tawag ng Tanghalan Kids, but he lost the face-off round to Mackie Empuerto.
Edimar Bonghanoy joined in second season of Tawag ng Tanghalan, but he lost.
Nikole Kyle Bernido auditioned on the first season of The Voice Kids and joined Team Sarah. She was eliminated in the sing-offs. She also joined the second season of Tawag ng Tanghalan, and won as daily winner but she lost to Quarter II semi-finalist Rico Garcia.
 Sharlla Cerilles auditioned on the third season of The Voice Kids and joined Team Sharon. She was eliminated in the sing-offs.
Ivan Navares auditioned on the first season of The Voice Teens and joined Team Sarah. He was eliminated in the First Live Shows to Jona Marie Soquite who eventually won as the grand champion of the season.
Jessmar Calayaan joined in first season of Tawag ng Tanghalan, but he lost. He returned to second season for the Resbak week, and won as daily winner but he lost to Arbie Baula.
Ericka Joy Uychiat won as daily winner in first season of Tawag ng Tanghalan, but she lost to Arnel Mendoza.
Luzviminda Piedad joined in first season of Tawag ng Tanghalan, but she lost. She was also a participant of Kahit Sino Pwede, a former segment of Eat Bulaga!.
Rosaly Bausin joined in first season of Tawag ng Tanghalan, but she lost. She was also a participant on Stars on 45, a former segment of It's Showtime.
Emmar Cabilogan joined in first season of Tawag ng Tanghalan, but he lost.
Christine Lyka Estrella joined in second season of Tawag ng Tanghalan, but she lost. She returned to third season of Tawag ng Tanghalan, and won as daily winner but she lost to Emil Sinagpulo.
Reign Lanz Marpuri joined in third season of Tawag ng Tanghalan, but she lost.
Roque Belino joined in Idol Philippines. He was eliminated in the Solo Rounds.
Angelica Siocson joined in first season of Tawag ng Tanghalan, but she lost.
Jun Gudez joined in first season of Tawag ng Tanghalan under the screen name, Pedro Gudez, but he lost.
Jhianne Grantusa joined in second season of Tawag ng Tanghalan, but she lost.
Apple Delleva won as daily winner in first season of Tawag ng Tanghalan, but she lost to Jex de Castro.
Anthony Lapinig joined in first season of Tawag ng Tanghalan, but he lost.
Isaac Zamudio auditioned on the first season of The Voice Kids and became a 3-chair turner. He joined Team Sarah, but was eliminated in the Battles to Lyca Gairanod who eventually won as the grand champion of the season. He was also  a participant of Barangay Singing Idol, a former segment of Eat Bulaga!. He also joined in third season of Tawag ng Tanghalan, and won as daily winner but he lost to Windimie Yntong.

"Tawag ng Tanghalan sa Tahanan"
Daniel Briones was a participant of Just Duet, a former segment of Eat Bulaga!. He recently competed in the segment of WishCovery of Wish 107.5 as one of the participants in the wildcard round. He  was also a participant of Willie of Fortune, a discontinued and pre-lockdown segment of Wowowin.

"New Normal"
Shan Dela Vega joined in Idol Philippines. She did not advance and received the golden ticket in Idol City.
Lecelle Trinidad auditioned on the first season of The Voice of the Philippines and joined Team Sarah. She was eliminated in Battle Round to Morissette Amon.
Ramil Permigones joined in Idol Philippines. He was eliminated in Do or Die Round. He also joined in first season of I Can See Your Voice as one of the mystery singers.
Randy Salonga is the father of former IV of Spades member Unique Salonga.
Trixie Dayrit won as daily winner in first season of Tawag ng Tanghalan, but she lost to Lendon Zuñiga.
Mich Primavera joined in Idol Philippines under the screen name, Michelle Primavera. She was eliminated in Solo Round.
Aljon Gutierrez recently competed in the second season of The Clash as one of the Top 12 contenders and finished in sixth place.
Lady Diana Onnagan was a former member of 5th Gen, a Filipino Acapella group together with Rhap Salazar. 
Jam Mariz Juane won as daily winner in third season of Tawag ng Tanghalan, but she lost to Elaine Duran who became the first TNT Record Holder and eventually won as the grand champion of the season.
Chaddy Ruaza won as daily winner in first season of Tawag ng Tanghalan under the screen name, Tsaddi Ruaza, and became a defending champion but she lost to Mary Gidget Dela Llana. She returned in the same season, won again as daily winner and became a defending champion but she lost again to Casiana Illescas. She returned again in second season for the Resbak week again, now under the screen name, Chaddy Ruaza, but she lost once again. She recently competed in the second season of The Clash under the screen name, Zaddi Ruaza, as one of the Top 32 contenders, but she lost to Sassa Dagdag.
Venisse Nicole Sy joined in first season of Tawag ng Tanghalan, but she lost. She also joined in first season of I Can See Your Voice as one of the mystery singers.
Paolo Onesa auditioned on the first season of The Voice of the Philippines and joined Team Bamboo. He was eliminated in the Fifth Live Shows to Myk Perez. He also joined in second season of Tawag ng Tanghalan, but he lost. He also became one of the Songbees in The Singing Bee.
James Alfafara won as daily winner in second season of Tawag ng Tanghalan under the screen name, James Matthew Alfafara, and became a defending champion but he lost to Romeo Magbanua Jr. He returned in third season, but he lost.
Makki Lucino won as daily winner in first season of Tawag ng Tanghalan under the screen name, Marc Lucino, but she lost to Marielle Montellano. She was also a participant of BakClash, a former segment of Eat Bulaga!.
Mary Joyce Belen won as daily winner in second season of Tawag ng Tanghalan, but she lost to Sofronio Vasquez.
Rachell Laylo joined in third season of Tawag ng Tanghalan, but she lost.
Luis Gragera joined in first season of Tawag ng Tanghalan, but he was gonged by Rey Valera. 
Paula Mañosca is the daughter of Stars on 45 grand winner Haydee Mañosca.
Venus Pelobello won as daily winner in first season of Tawag ng Tanghalan, and became a defending champion but she lost to Reymar Mejares. She returned for the Resbak week in second season, but she lost.
Jawji Altamera joined in first season of Tawag ng Tanghalan under the screen name, Joji Anne Altamera, but she lost.
Mark Anthony Sorita joined in first season of Tawag ng Tanghalan under the screen name, Mark Sorita, but he lost. He returned in the same season, won as daily winner and became a defending champion but he lost to Antonio Sabalaza. He returned again in second season, won again as daily winner but he lost to JM Bales. He was also recently competed in the second season of The Clash under the screen name, GP Sorita, as one of the Top 32 contenders, but he lost to Sofia Qeblawi.
Charlyn Yangyang joined in second season of Tawag ng Tanghalan, but she lost.
Ayegee Paredes won as daily winner in second season of Tawag ng Tanghalan under the screen name, Ivy Grace Paredes, and became a defending champion but she lost to Manny Lucas. She also joined in thirteen season of The X Factor UK but unable to go in the competition for "Judge Houses" round due to issue with VISA.
Leonard Ibañez joined in third season of Tawag ng Tanghalan under the screen name, John Lenard Ibañez, but he lost.
Gerom Callo is the former husband of Tawag ng Tanghalan first season Grand Finalist Maricel Callo.
Ophalene Rose Paghubasan joined in second season of Tawag ng Tanghalan under the screen name, Ophalene Barba, but she lost.
Bializa Manuel joined in second season of Tawag ng Tanghalan, but she lost.
Kevin Madridejos joined in third season of Tawag ng Tanghalan, but he lost.
JM Joven won as daily winner in second season of Tawag ng Tanghalan, and became a defending champion but he lost to Mark Douglas Dagal. He returned in third season, won again as daily winner and became a defending champion but he lost again to Alvie Chatto.
Ela Sandiwa joined in second season of Tawag ng Tanghalan under the screen name, Marinela Sandiwa, but  was almost gonged  and later, she lost.
Donna Gift Ricafrente joined in second season of Tawag ng Tanghalan, but she lost. She was also a participant of Birit Baby and Just Duet, former segments of Eat Bulaga!. She also joined in first season of I Can See Your Voice as one of the mystery singers.
Bernadette Oliva won as daily winner in third season of Tawag ng Tanghalan, but she lost to Caesar Recto.
Marlo Falcon was a participant of Willie of Fortune, a former segment of Wowowee and Wowowillie. He was also a participant of Diz iz It!, a former segment of Eat Bulaga!.
Joy Amosco was one of the choices of Bawal Judgmental, a current segment of Eat Bulaga!.
Nolo Lopez recently competed in the first season of The Clash as one of the Top 62 contenders, but he lost to Jong Madaliday.
Fatima Claire Espiritu auditioned on the first season of The Voice Teens, and joined Team Lea. She was eliminated in the battles. She recently competed in the first season of The Clash as one of the Top 62 contenders, but she lost to Golden Cañedo who eventually won as the grand champion of the season.
Gerhard Krysstopher won as daily winner in first season of Tawag ng Tanghalan under the screen name, Gerhard Pagunsan, and became a defending champion but he lost to Sotelo Abarquez.
Classica Samson was a former employee of ABS-CBN, but she resigned in 2018.

References 

Notes

Scores

Sources

External links
 Tawag ng Tanghalan

Tawag ng Tanghalan seasons
2020 Philippine television seasons
2021 Philippine television seasons